Football Manager 2015 (abbreviated to FM15) is a football management simulation video game developed by Sports Interactive and published by Sega. It was released on Microsoft Windows, OS X, and Linux platforms on 7 November 2014, and on iOS and Android platforms on 20 November 2014.

Gameplay
FM15 features similar gameplay to that of the Football Manager series. Gameplay consists of taking charge of a professional association football team, as the team manager. Players can sign football players to contracts, manage finances for the club, and give team talks to players. FM15 is a simulation of real world management, with the player being judged on various factors by the club's AI owners and board.

The game offers a variety of new features such as being the first game of the franchise to include Twitch integration so people can stream their game online.  There has been an overhaul in the match engine, adding 2000 new animations into the game, improved ball physics and improved shots, passes, long balls etc. The player models have also been updated adding new realism into the game along with a brand new lighting model. FM15 featured  a complete redesign of the game's interface, introducing a  new sidebar giving a new look on Football Manager 2015.

Managers now choose between being a "Tracksuit" manager or a "Tactical" manager; when designing a new avatar. A Tracksuit manager specialises in training; and on the field knowledge, whilst a tactical manager specialises in tactics, formations and player morale.

Reception

FM15 received "generally favourable reviews" according to media review aggregator website Metacritic. Critics was mostly positive, claiming that is an improvement of its predecessor, but criticise the game's new match engine, stating there are more defensive blunders than Football Manager 2014. However, there were problems faced by many people that reduced the quality of the gameplay which even until now, still has not been improved.

One of the most common algorithmic problem faced by people is the demand of first team players for first team chances. Some players complained about their first team appearance to be very limited even though they just signed for the team and the season just began. A new player that was signed recently asked for first team chances even though there are still many matches to be played yet. This algorithmic programming is a stumbling block for most customers to the point, they have to either comply or sell that particular player(s).

References

External links 
 Official website
 Developer website

2014 video games
Android (operating system) games
2014
MacOS games
Linux games
IOS games
Sega video games
Video games developed in the United Kingdom
Windows games
Video games with Steam Workshop support
La Liga licensed video games